Cryptothylax minutus is a species of frogs in the family Hyperoliidae found in the Democratic Republic of the Congo and possibly the Republic of the Congo.
Its natural habitats are subtropical or tropical moist lowland forests, rivers, swamps, freshwater lakes, freshwater marshes, intermittent freshwater marshes, rural gardens, and heavily degraded former forests.

References

Cryptothylax
Taxa named by Raymond Laurent
Amphibians described in 1976
Taxonomy articles created by Polbot
Endemic fauna of the Democratic Republic of the Congo